Humanoid City Live is a live DVD and CD by German band Tokio Hotel, released on July 20, 2010. It was recorded on April 12, 2010, at the Mediolanum Forum in Milan, Italy, during their Welcome to Humanoid City Tour. The DVD bonus material includes a new "backstage" episode of Tokio Hotel TV, and a photo gallery. The tour dates in Europe in 2010 were formally announced Thursday October 22, 2009. The tour started on February 22 and was visited 32 cities in major concert halls.

CD/DVD track listing
 "Noise"
 "Human Connect to Human"
 "Break Away"
 "Pain of Love"
 "World Behind My Wall"
 "Hey You"
 "Alien" (English Version)
 "Ready, Set, Go!"
 "Humanoid" (German Version)
 "Phantomrider"
 "Dogs Unleashed"
 "Love & Death"
 "In Your Shadow (I Can Shine)"
 "Automatic"
 "Screamin'"
 "Darkside of the Sun"
 "Zoom Into Me"
 "Monsoon"
 "Forever Now"

Chart positions

Weekly charts

References

Tokio Hotel video albums
Live video albums
2010 video albums
2010 live albums
Tokio Hotel live albums